Březová-Oleško is a municipality in Prague-West District in the Central Bohemian Region of the Czech Republic. It has about 1,300 inhabitants.

Administrative parts
The municipality is made up of villages of Březová and Oleško.

Geography
It lies in the Prague Plateau on the right bank of the river Vltava. The municipality is located on a promontory delimited by the valleys of the Vltava and Zahořanský Stream.

History
The first written mention of both villages is from 1310 (as part of a donation to the Ostrov Monastery, written in a deed of the Pope Clement V).

Transport
The municipality can be reached by regular transport from Prague, but it is impassable for cars as it is a dead end.

References

External links

Villages in Prague-West District